A tactical ballistic missile (TBM), or battlefield range ballistic missile (BRBM), is a ballistic missile designed for short-range battlefield use. Tactical ballistic missiles are usually mobile to ensure survivability and quick deployment, as well as carrying a variety of warheads to target enemy facilities, assembly areas, artillery, and other targets behind the front lines. Warheads can include conventional high explosive, chemical, biological, or nuclear warheads. Typically tactical nuclear weapons are limited in their total yield compared to strategic rockets.

Design

Tactical ballistic missiles fill the gap between conventional rocket artillery and longer-range short-range ballistic missiles.  Tactical missiles can carry heavy payloads deep behind enemy lines in comparison to rockets or gun artillery, while having better mobility and less expense than the more strategic theatre missiles.  Additionally, due to their mobility, tactical missiles are better suited to responding to developments on the battlefield.

For many nations, tactical missiles represent the upper limit of their land-based military equipment.  They can provide a powerful weapon for a very economical price, and in some cases are sought to help level the field against opponents who are clearly superior in other areas of military technology.  Currently, ballistic missile technology is relatively accessible to nations that may find other military technology beyond easy reach.

Ballistic missiles are still difficult to defeat on the battlefield.  Newer air defense systems have improved ability to intercept tactical missiles, but still can not reliably protect assets against ballistic missile threats.  This allows a moderate force of missiles to threaten a superior enemy by penetrating their air defenses better than with conventional aircraft, while providing a deeper strike than conventional artillery.

Propulsion 
Early large rockets and missiles were propelled by liquid-propellant rocket engines, as the first types developed. These were replaced as soon as possible by solid fuel rocket motors. Liquid propellants involve cryogenic (liquid oxygen) or corrosive (nitric acid) oxidisers. These must be loaded before launch, delaying the rocket's time into action. This delay was a problem for large strategic missiles, but especially so for tactical.

Missiles, particularly in the Soviet Union, switched to using storable liquid propellants such as IRFNA, inhibited nitric acid. These were still hazardous to handle, but could be stored pre-loaded in the missile. This also allowed the development of single vehicle transporter erector launchers (TEL), rather than the previous convoy of carriers, launchers, fuel vehicles and service vehicles.

Western missiles adopted solid propellants instead, which were inherently storable, and later Warsaw Pact missiles followed suit. Tactical missiles are now almost universally solid-fuelled, except for some states using indigenous derivatives of the original Scud platform.

Specific TBMs

See also 
 List of missiles

Notes

References